Laforey-class destroyer may refer to:
 Laforey-class destroyer (1913), a class of 22 Royal Navy destroyers launched from 1913 to 1915
 L and M-class destroyer or Laforey class, a class of 16 Royal Navy destroyers launched from 1939 to 1941